"Tangerine" is a popular song.
The music was written by Victor Schertzinger, the lyrics by Johnny Mercer. The song was published in 1941 and soon became a jazz standard.

Background
"Tangerine" was introduced to a broad audience in the 1942 movie, The Fleet's In, produced by Paramount Pictures, directed by Schertzinger just before his death, and starring Dorothy Lamour, William Holden, Eddie Bracken, singer Cass Daley, and Betty Hutton in her feature film debut.

The song portrays a fictitious South American woman with universally recognized allure: "When she dances by, / Señoritas stare / And caballeros sigh." As one of Mercer's biographers explained the initial popularity: "Latin America, the one part of the world not engulfed in World War II, became a favorite topic for songs and films for Americans who wanted momentarily to forget about the conflagration."

Charted recordings
The most popular recorded version of the song was made by the performers who introduced it in the film: the Jimmy Dorsey Orchestra with vocalists Helen O'Connell and Bob Eberly. The recording was released in January 1942 by Decca Records as catalog number 4123. The record first reached the Billboard charts on April 10, 1942, and lasted 15 weeks on the chart, including six weeks at #1. The lyrics in this version differ slightly from those in the movie.  On the record, Eberly sings "And I've seen toasts to Tangerine / Raised in every bar across the Argentine," the lyric that became standard.  In the movie at that point, the line is "And I've seen times when Tangerine / Had the bourgeoisie believing she were queen."

A disco instrumental version by the Salsoul Orchestra brought the song back into the U.S. top twenty in 1976. It also reached #11 on the US, Easy Listening chart.

Chart performance

The Salsoul Orchestra

Other notable covers
More than 100 acts have recorded "Tangerine", including such notable artists as: 
Ilya Serov featuring Poncho Sanchez
Oscar Peterson
Tony Bennett
Dave Brubeck
Herb Alpert
Chet Baker and Paul Desmond
Jim Hall
Harry Connick Jr.
Benny Goodman
Dr. John
Eliane Elias
Vaughn Monroe
Frank Sinatra
Dean Martin
Lawrence Welk, 
Stan Getz (with Bob Brookmeyer)
Gene Ammons
Lou Donaldson
Zoot Sims and Dexter Gordon.

Popular culture
In addition:
 The tune was featured as background music in the films Double Indemnity (1944), Sorry, Wrong Number (1948) and Star Trek III: The Search for Spock (1984).
 In 1976, All In the Family gave a nod to the song in the episode "Archie's Operation", when Archie Bunker burst into it repeatedly to interrupt son-in-law Mike's efforts to help pay for Archie's surgery.
 The Pet Milk company used the melody for a 1960s liquid diet product called Sego. The opening line "Tangerine, she is all they say" was replaced by "There she goes, she's a Sego girl." 
The tune later became the jingle for Pillsbury's Figurines, a diet aid, during the 1970s.

References

1941 songs
1942 singles
1940s jazz standards
1976 singles
Number-one singles in the United States
Songs with lyrics by Johnny Mercer
Songs with music by Victor Schertzinger
Songs written for films
Dorothy Lamour songs
Nat King Cole songs
Disco songs
Salsoul Orchestra songs